The men's 60 kg competition of the karate events at the 2015 Pan American Games in Toronto, Ontario, Canada, was held on July 23 at the Mississauga Sports Centre.

Schedule
All times are Central Standard Time (UTC-6).

Results
The final results.
Legend
KK — Forfeit (Kiken)

Pool 1

Pool 2

Finals

References

Karate at the 2015 Pan American Games